Ulf Helmer Johan Eriksson (born 26 May 1942) is a retired football referee from Sollefteå, Sweden and a former football player. He was a referee officiating at the 1978 FIFA World Cup, including the match between Argentina and Poland.

References

External links
 Referee profile at WorldFootball.net

1942 births
Swedish football referees
Living people
FIFA World Cup referees
1978 FIFA World Cup referees
Olympic football referees
Football referees at the 1980 Summer Olympics
Dobloug Prize winners
People from Västernorrland County